Mark Stone (born 29 January 1979) is a British journalist who is currently US correspondent for Sky News. He was previously the network’s Europe Correspondent (2015–19), Asia Correspondent (2012–15) and Middle East correspondent.

Early life
Stone was educated in the United Kingdom, first at Hawtreys School in Wiltshire, then at Cheltenham College, followed by the University of East Anglia (BA History of Art and Architecture, 2001).

Life and career
Stone joined the London Bureau of ABC News, the news division of the American Broadcasting Company, in 2002, as a producer.

Between 2003-04, he spent nearly a year living in Baghdad, Iraq where he reported on the capture of Saddam Hussein and the growing insurgency in Iraq. He was part of a team which won an Emmy for their coverage.

Stone joined Sky News in 2005 working first as a producer before switching to reporting in 2007. In 2012 he became the network's Asia Correspondent, based in Beijing, China. In 2015 he moved to Brussels, Belgium as the network's Europe Correspondent.

Stone has reported from a wide number of locations in the UK and around the world, from the ongoing conflicts in Afghanistan, Iraq and Libya to the 2011 riots in London.

He was one of the first British journalists to ‘embed’ with the British Army in Afghanistan's Helmand Province in July 2006. He met the former KGB spy, Alexander Litvinenko in London, two weeks before he was poisoned. He covered Mr. Litvinenko's death and its wider implications in detail.

In 2011, he spent 6 weeks reporting extensively from Libya on the uprising against Muammar Gaddafi, the NATO intervention and the subsequent death of Muammar Gaddafi.

In August 2011, Stone played a widely reported and important role in Sky News coverage of the London riots. In one of the first examples of the use of mobile devices for newsgathering, Stone used just an iPhone, rather than relying upon the usual accompaniment of a professional television crew, to record and broadcast scenes of arson and his own confrontation with looters, which both led Sky News bulletins and were covered widely by broadcasters around the world. Online, within 24 hours, his videos had been viewed by nearly a million people. He was nominated by the Royal Television Society for his innovative coverage of the riots.

In March 2013, Stone and his cameraman were detained in Beijing's Tiananmen Square. They had been filming a report about the 1989 protests and were then detained after being accused of not having the right accreditation. They broadcast live from a police van as it drove them away for questioning. They were released after several hours of interrogation.

In July 2013, Stone travelled to North Korea as part of a select group of journalists granted access to the reclusive country. He and his Sky News team produced the first ever live international broadcasts from events at locations around the capital Pyongyang, allowing viewers a real-time glimpse inside North Korea.

He provided extensive coverage of Europe's migration crisis between 2015 and 2017. He reported extensively on Britain’s exit from the European Union - Brexit - from Sky News's Europe Bureau in Brussels.

In May 2019 Sky announced that Stone would become the network's Middle East Correspondent.

In November 2020, during the United States presidential election, Stone attended the Four Seasons Total Landscaping press conference where he informed Rudy Giuliani that all of the American networks had called the race for Joe Biden.

In March 2021, Sky News announced that Stone would become the network’s US correspondent based in Washington DC and would take up the role later in the year.

In June 2021, Stone was criticized for a social media exchange in which he appeared to explain or excuse antisemitism in the United Kingdom; he subsequently apologized and stated that this was not his intention.

Awards
Stone’s work across Asia was recognised by the Royal Television Society in 2014 when he was nominated as RTS Journalist of the Year alongside Bill Neely and Jeremy Bowen.

His work on migration across Europe in 2016 formed a central part of Sky’s Emmy award winning coverage of the same year.

His work in Burma, North Korea and China has also been recognised by the OneWorld Media Awards.

In 2011, Stone was nominated and shortlisted for an award by the Royal Television Society for his innovative use of mobile journalism in his coverage of the London riots.

In 2004, working for ABC News, Stone and his team were awarded an Emmy for their coverage of the Iraq War.

Family
Stone is married with three children. He lives in Washington DC. His brother is Col. Guy Stone, Welsh Guards who was (2019–20) Brigade Major, Household Division.

References

External links
 
 

1979 births
Living people
People educated at Hawtreys
People educated at Cheltenham College
Alumni of the University of East Anglia
English male journalists
English television journalists
English television presenters
Sky News newsreaders and journalists